Hungary competed at the 2017 World Games held in Wrocław, Poland.

Medalists

Air sports 

Ferenc Tóth won the gold medal in the glider aerobatics event.

Ju-jitsu 

Kristó Szűcs won the gold medal in the men's ne-waza open and the silver medal in the men's ne-waza 94 kg event.

References 

Nations at the 2017 World Games
2017 in Hungarian sport
2017